Joe Bini (born Giuseppe Gaetano Bini; 1963) is an American film editor.

Life 
Bini was born in San Mateo, California to Aurora Cerro Bini and Louis John Bini. As a film editor, he has collaborated with Werner Herzog on twenty-seven documentaries and feature films in twenty years, including: Little Dieter Needs to Fly (1997), Invincible (2001), Grizzly Man (2005), Rescue Dawn (2007), and Encounters at the End of the World (2007), which was nominated for the Academy Award for Best Documentary Feature.

Bini edited Lynne Ramsay's We Need to Talk About Kevin (2011) for BBC Films and Independent and American Honey (2016) with director Andrea Arnold. He edited the 2017 film You Were Never Really Here, directed by Ramsay.

He is father to Elia Bini (born in Tyumen, Siberia) whose mother is Caitlin Bini. Joe is currently married to filmmaker Maya Hawke.

Sundance Film Festival
Bini was a member of the Jury in the Documentary category for the 2006 Sundance Film Festival.  He also won the 2008 Documentary Editing Award for editing Roman Polanski: Wanted and Desired.

Emmy Awards
For co-writing and editing the documentary film Roman Polanski: Wanted and Desired (2008), Bini won a Primetime Emmy Award for Outstanding Writing for a Nonfiction Programming and received a nomination for Outstanding Picture Editing for a Nonfiction Program.

Cannes Film Festival
Was awarded Prix Vulcain de L’Artiste-Technicien, Special Distinction at Cannes Film Festival 2011 for his work on We Need to Talk About Kevin.

References

External links

1963 births
Living people